Peraxilla colensoi, the scarlet mistletoe, is a shrubby parasitic plant composed of broad, leathery leaves that grow up to 8 cm long and have a red edge. The common name is derived from the scarlet petals of the plant that bloom every October to January. These mistletoes are parasitic plants whose seeds attach themselves to host plants. The most common host for these plants is the silver beech. The plant can grow up to 3 meters tall and are often located in low altitudes throughout the North and South Islands of New Zealand.

Description
This is a parasitic plant and relies on its host to grow and survive on. Individuals of this species are shrubs up to 3m long and will further out to branches on its host. It has glossy green paired leaves and red tubular flowers. The fruit produced is a small, round yellow color and the leathery leaves of the shrub will fall and cover the forest floor.

Distribution
Peraxilla colensoi naturally occurs to grow on other trees in New Zealand. It is native to the North and South Island of New Zealand. Specifically it can be found on the South Island beech forests. This is a parasitic plant therefore it grows on other trees, plants, and flowers from October to January. The abundance of Peraxilla colensoi appears to follow a structural gradient in forests. Forests that contain open-canopied, all-aged forests had higher densities of peraxilla colensoi, while a dense-canopied, even-aged forest contained little to no Peraxilla. The position of this mistletoe is likely dependent on the opportunities available for seed dispersing birds to excrete and regurgitate seeds. This indicates that different forest structures can present different opportunities for birds which impacts mistletoe establishment. Peraxilla is likely to be most common in areas that observe frequent bird appearances. Several studies have observed larger host trees had a higher rate of peraxilla in comparison to smaller host trees. Larger host trees are capable of supporting a higher mistletoe volume than smaller host trees. The correlation between tree size and mistletoe abundance is that larger trees are able to receive a higher number of mistletoe seeds since they are better perches for birds, resulting in the positive relationship between tree size and mistletoe abundance.

Habitat and ecology
The species is an annual short-lived plant that flowers between the months October through January. Temperatures during this time could be as low as 68 degrees fahrenheit to a high of 86 degrees fahrenheit. This is a parasitic plant, so it latches onto other species to grow, therefore interacting with other species. It relies on its host species for nutrients and water. It can be found in the mid elevation points on trees.

Flowers and fruit
Flowers of Peraxilla colensoi are red and orange in color. They usually flower in the months of October to January. The flowers grow in groups, and are usually found in clumps of 3 to 10. The flower heads usually grow up to 60 mm long. The buds of the flower are not able to open up by themselves. They require assistance from birds that try to extract the nectar from the flower. They twist on the top of the flower that allows it to open up and this helps the birds get nectar while also allowing the flower fertilize as well. The flowers are able to fall and litter the entire floor below them.

Peraxilla colensoi also has fruits that grow to be small and oval shaped and are a yellowish golden color when they ripen. These fruits are eaten by the birds in the area and the seeds of the fruit are excreted by the bird. This allows the plant to spread to new locations. In order for the seed to develop it must land on a branch so it can attach with its haustoria, which are sucker like roots. The preferred host species for this parasitic species is Lophozonia menziesii but there are 16 other species that are known to be host species for Peraxilla colensoi.

Food
Peraxilla colensoi is browsed by the common brushtail possum, an invasive species in New Zealand. The increase in browsing by this animal has caused a great depletion in the plant species, leading to it possibly being endangered.

Since Peraxilla colensoi is a parasitic plant its seeds attach itself to its preferred host as a source of food, with its most common host being silver beeches. The fruit of the plant when ripe is eaten by birds. These birds excrete these seeds which hopefully will land on a branch and attach through its adaptive sucker roots known as haustoria.

References 

Loranthaceae
Flora of New Zealand